Martinsville is a small town near Morisset and west of Lake Macquarie in New South Wales, Australia. It is part of the West Ward of the City of Lake Macquarie local government area.

It was first settled by Europeans between 1861 and 1866. The first industry in the area was timber. The public school opened in 1878, but this was eventually closed and pupils transferred to Cooranbong Community School. The town sits in a small valley at the base of the Watagan Mountains.

References

 Cooranbong, first town in Lake Macquarie, 1827–1997: a history including Martinsville and Dora Creek by Michael Chamberlain (description).

External links
 History of Martinsville (Lake Macquarie City Library)

Suburbs of Lake Macquarie
1861 establishments in Australia